Keaton is an Old English surname derived from a place name meaning "place of hawks" less common as a given name.

People

Given name
Keaton Ellerby (born 1988), Canadian professional ice hockey player
Keaton Henson (born 1988), English folk rock musician
Keaton Isaksson (born 1994), Finnish professional footballer
Keaton Jennings (born 1992), South African-born English cricketer
Keaton Kristick (born 1988), former American football linebacker
Keaton McCargo (born 1995), American freestyle skier
Keaton Nankivil (born 1989), former American basketball player
Keaton Nigel Cooke, American film actor, television actor, and singer
Keaton Parks (born 1997), American professional soccer player
Keaton Simons (born 1978), American recording and performing artist
Keaton Stromberg, former member of Emblem3
Keaton Sutherland (born 1997), American football player
Keaton Tyndall (born 1992), American actor
Keaton Yamada (born 1945), Japanese actor

Surname
Ben Keaton (born 1956), Irish actor
Camille Keaton (born 1947), American actress
David Keaton (died 2015), member of the Quincy Five group convicted of killing a sheriff
Diane Keaton (born 1946), American actress
Joe Keaton (1867–1946), American vaudeville performer and silent film actor
Myra Keaton (1877–1955), American vaudeville performer and silent film actress and wife of Joe and mother of Buster
Buster Keaton (1895–1966), American actor and son of Joe
Jonathan D. Keaton (born 1946), American clergyman
Josh Keaton (born ????), American actor
Keader Keaton, Colonial American officer in the American Revolutionary War and founder of Anglo-American settlement in Richmond County, North Carolina
Michael Keaton (born 1951), American actor

Fictional
Alex P. Keaton, character on Family Ties
Taichi Keaton, title character of the Master Keaton series of novels

Given names
English given names
English-language surnames